The 1999 Estonian Figure Skating Championships were held in Tallinn from February 19 to 21, 1999. Skaters competed in the disciplines of men's singles, ladies' singles, pair skating, and ice dancing on the senior and junior levels.

Senior-Level results

Men

Ladies

Pairs

Ice dancing

Junior results
The 1999 Estonian Junior Figure Skating Championships took place in Tallinn from March 12 through 13, 1999.

Ladies
9 participants

Pairs

Ice dancing

References

Figure Skating Championships
Estonian Figure Skating Championships, 1999
Estonian Figure Skating Championships